Huhkola is a district in the Itäharju-Varissuo ward of the city of Turku, in Finland. It is located to the east of the city, and is mainly a low-density residential suburb.

The population of Huhkola was 986, decreasing at an annual rate of 3.75%. 20.79% of the district's population were under 15 years old, while 4.77% were over 65. The district's linguistic makeup was 91.68% Finnish, 6.09% Swedish, and 2.23% other.

See also
 Districts of Turku
 Districts of Turku by population

Districts of Turku